Maximiliano Nicolás "Maxi" Moralez (born 27 February 1987) is an Argentine professional footballer who plays as an attacking midfielder for Argentine Primera División club Racing. He is nicknamed frasquito (English: little flask).

Club career

Moralez started playing professionally for Racing Club in the Argentine Primera División during the 2005 Clausura tournament, entering the field on a 2–2 draw with Colón. In 2007, Moralez was bought by FC Moscow. However, after only half a season in the Russian club, he was loaned back to Racing Club. Moralez helped his club avoid relegation during the 2007–08 season, scoring the winning goal against Belgrano in the relegation playoff.

For the 2009 Clausura tournament, Moralez was bought by Vélez Sársfield. During his first season in the club, he helped the team become Argentine champion, playing 14 (out of 19) games and scoring 5 goals. He scored the winning goal against Huracán on the 83rd minute of the final game, giving Vélez the 1–0 victory necessary to win the championship. During the following tournament, the 2009 Apertura, Moralez was Vélez' top goalscorer (along Jonathan Cristaldo) with 5 goals each.

On 5 March 2011, Moralez renewed his contract with Vélez until June 2013. During that semester, he won his second league title with the club (the 2011 Clausura) playing 15 of the 19 games, and scoring 4 goals. He also played 11 of the 12 games of his team's Copa Libertadores semi-finalist campaign, scoring 5 goals.

On 27 July 2011, Atalanta B.C., recently promoted to the Serie A, paid Moralez's buyout clause to Vélez Sársfield (€8 million for the 50% transfer rights owned by Vélez). The Argentine midfielder was introduced by his new club three days later.

On 24 December 2015, Jesús Martínez Murguía (León's President), confirmed that Moralez would be playing the 2016 tournament with Club León.

On 15 February 2017, New York City FC announced that he had been signed as a Designated Player.

International career

In 2007, Moralez was called for the Argentina under-20 squad for the South American Youth Championship held in Paraguay. Later that year he was part of Argentina FIFA W-20 World Cup title winning team. He played along Sergio Agüero and Mauro Zárate in the attack. Moralez was third highest scorer in the tournament (bronze shoe) and was named second best player (silver ball), behind his teammate Agüero.

In November 2010, Moralez was selected as part of an Argentine league squad to train twice weekly with the Argentina national team. He made his senior international debut on a 4–1 friendly victory over Venezuela on 16 March 2011.

Career statistics

Club

Honours
Vélez Sársfield
Argentine Primera División: 2009 Clausura, 2011 Clausura

New York City FC
MLS Cup: 2021
Campeones Cup: 2022

Argentina U20
FIFA U-20 World Cup: 2007

Individual
FIFA U-20 World Cup Silver Ball: 2007
FIFA U-20 World Cup Bronze Shoe: 2007
MLS All-Star: 2019
MLS Best XI: 2019

References

External links

 Profile at Vélez Sársfield official website 
 
 Maximiliano Moralez Interview

1987 births
Living people
People from Rosario Department
Sportspeople from Santa Fe Province
Argentine footballers
Association football midfielders
Racing Club de Avellaneda footballers
FC Moscow players
Club Atlético Vélez Sarsfield footballers
Atalanta B.C. players
Club León footballers
New York City FC players
Argentine Primera División players
Russian Premier League players
Serie A players
Liga MX players
Designated Players (MLS)
Major League Soccer players
Argentina under-20 international footballers
Argentina international footballers
Argentine expatriate footballers
Argentine expatriate sportspeople in Russia
Argentine expatriate sportspeople in Italy
Argentine expatriate sportspeople in Mexico
Argentine expatriate sportspeople in the United States
Expatriate footballers in Russia
Expatriate footballers in Italy
Expatriate footballers in Mexico
Expatriate soccer players in the United States